Jickovice is a municipality and village in Písek District in the South Bohemian Region of the Czech Republic. It has about 100 inhabitants.

Administrative parts
The village of Varta is an administrative part of Jickovice.

References

Villages in Písek District